Carlos Wyld Ospina (June 19, 1891, Antigua Guatemala – June 19, 1956, Quetzaltenango) was a Guatemalan novelist, essayist and poet.

Biography 
Wyld was born as son of Guillermo Wyld Quiñones and his wife Soledad Ospina Chaparro, a niece of the Colombian president Mariano Ospina Rodríguez. His paternal grandfather was English.

Wyld spent periods in Mexico and in Guatemala City, but most of his life he lived in Quetzaltenango. Together with Porfirio Barba Jacob he founded the paper Churubusc in Mexico, and was also director of the Guatemalan paperEl Zaraguat. Like Alberto Velásquez Günther, Carlos Mérida and Rafael Yela Günther, he joined the writers' group Los Líricos. He was a member of the Academia Guatemalteca de la Lengua and of the Sociedad de Geografía e Historia (Society of Geography and History).

References

External links 
 
 Photo

Guatemalan essayists
Male essayists
Guatemalan people of English descent
20th-century Guatemalan poets
20th-century male writers
Guatemalan male poets
Guatemalan novelists
Male novelists
People from Guatemala City
1891 births
1956 deaths
20th-century novelists
20th-century essayists